The Singuang Ferry Wharf is a wharf in Lingya District, Kaohsiung, Taiwan. It is the 22nd pier of Port of Kaohsiung.

Architecture
The wharf features the Seaboard Park and Shinkong Avenue. It has a ring-shaped walkway that provides a great view of the harbor.

Festivities
The Kaohsiung Lantern Festival, Kaohsiung International Container Arts Festival and New Year's Eve are held here every year.

Transportation
The wharf is accessible within walking distance west from Sanduo Shopping District Station of Kaohsiung MRT. The wharf can also be accessed by walking southwest of the Kaohsiung Exhibition Center light rail station.

See also
 List of tourist attractions in Taiwan

References

Lingya District
Tourist attractions in Kaohsiung
Wharves in Taiwan